Carex prairea, common name prairie sedge, is a species of Carex native to North America. It is a perennial.

Conservation status in the United States
It is listed as threatened in Maine and Pennsylvania,  and as a special concern species in Connecticut,

References

prairea
Flora of North America